South Hill Park is a street in the Hampstead district of London. It is within the London Borough of Camden, and some of its houses overlook Hampstead Heath.

Transport links
Hampstead Heath railway station, on the North London Line, is at the southern end of South Hill Park. Buses, chiefly the number 24, depart from nearby South End Green.

Ruth Ellis

The last woman to be hanged in Britain, Ruth Ellis, was sentenced to death for a murder committed on South Hill Park. She shot her boyfriend David Blakely outside a public house, The Magdala, on 10 April 1955.

In popular culture
The opening shots of 1965 film Licensed to Kill (a low-budget pastiche of James Bond films) are filmed at the southern end of the street near the entrance to Hampstead Heath opposite the station.

Notable residents
The Australian Prime Minister Andrew Fisher spent his retirement and last years in South Hill Park, 1922–28.
The film director Anthony Minghella lived in South Hill Park until his death in 2008. His son, Max Minghella, had a role in the film Hippie Hippie Shake, parts of which were shot in the street and its surrounding area.
Jonathan Ross and his family lived on South Hill Park in the 1990s.
The poet Adrian Mitchell lived in South Hill Park until his death in 2008.
David Baddiel
 Bill Oddie, ornithologist and comedian, lived in South Hill Park in the 70s and 80s
 Terrance Dicks, author and scriptwriter for Doctor Who, has lived in South Hill Park since the 60s
 Terry Gilliam, comedian, artist and film director, lived in South Hill Park in the 70s and 80s
 John Williams, classical guitarist, lived in South Hill Park in the 1970s and 80s

References

South Hill Park (London street)